Cırbıklar is a village in Tarsus  district of Mersin Province, Turkey. It is situated in Çukurova (Cilicia of antiquity) plains to the east of motor way . The population of Cırbıklar is 117 as of 2011.

References

Villages in Tarsus District